Simo Artturi Morri (born 10 November 1944) is a Finnish former sports shooter. He competed in two events at the 1968 Summer Olympics.

References

External links
 

1944 births
Living people
Finnish male sport shooters
Olympic shooters of Finland
Shooters at the 1968 Summer Olympics
People from Sysmä
Sportspeople from Päijät-Häme